Stefan Jakub Żółkiewski (9 December 1911 – 4 January 1991) was a Polish theoretist, historian of literature and literary critic. He was born and died in Warsaw. He was a co-founder of the Polish Workers' Party, editor-in-chief of Kuźnica (1945–1948), Polityka (1957–1958), Minister of Higher Education (1956–1959), director and professor of Polish Academy of Sciences and professor of Warsaw University.

Notable works
Kultura, socjologia, semiotyka literacka
Kultura literacka 1918–1932 (a monograph)

References
 

1911 births
1991 deaths
Writers from Warsaw
People from Warsaw Governorate
Polish Workers' Party politicians
Members of the Central Committee of the Polish United Workers' Party
Government ministers of Poland
Members of the State National Council
Members of the Polish Sejm 1947–1952
Members of the Polish Sejm 1952–1956
Members of the Polish Sejm 1957–1961
Members of the Polish Sejm 1961–1965
Members of the Polish Sejm 1965–1969
Polish literary critics
Polish male non-fiction writers
20th-century Polish historians
Academic staff of the University of Warsaw
Members of the Polish Academy of Sciences
Commanders with Star of the Order of Polonia Restituta
Recipients of the Order of the Banner of Work
Recipients of the Order of the Cross of Grunwald, 2nd class
Recipients of the Gold Cross of Merit (Poland)
Recipients of the Order of the Sacred Treasure
Stefan
Recipients of the State Award Badge (Poland)